Homberg may refer to:

Places

Germany
Homberg (Efze), administrative seat of Schwalm-Eder-Kreis, Hesse
Homberg (Ohm), in the district of Vogelsbergkreis, Hesse
Homberg, Westerwaldkreis, in the district of Westerwaldkreis, Rhineland-Palatinate 
Homberg, Kusel, in the district of Kusel, Rhineland-Palatinate 
Homberg (Ratingen), in Ratingen
Homberg (Duisburg), in Duisburg
Hömberg, municipality in the district of Rhein-Lahn, Rhineland-Palatinate
Homberg (Hinterland), mountain of Hesse

Switzerland
Homberg, Switzerland, in the Canton of Bern

People with the surname
 Wilhelm Homberg (1652-1715), Dutch chemist
 Herz Homberg (1749-1841), Austrian educator and writer
 Octave Homberg (1876-1941), French diplomat
 House of Homberg (medieval Switzerland)

See also 
 Homburg (disambiguation)
 Homburg (hat)
 Hamburg (disambiguation)